Benteng Station (BET) is a class I railway station located in Sawahpulo, Ujung, Semampir, Surabaya, Included in the Surabaya VIII Operation Area at an altitude of +4 meters.

The name "Benteng" began to be formally established in January 1950 based on the Buku Djarak untuk Djawa dan Madura.

Services
The following is a list of train services at the Benteng Station.

Passenger services
There is no passenger services at this station.

Freight services

References

External links

Railway stations in Surabaya
railway stations opened in 1886
1880s establishments in the Dutch East Indies